Occasionally the communicating branch to the anterior cutaneous and saphenous branches of the femoral is continued down, as a cutaneous branch, to the thigh and leg, as the cutaneous branch of the obturator nerve.

When this is so, it emerges from beneath the lower border of the Adductor longus, descends along the posterior margin of the sartorius to the medial side of the knee, where it pierces the deep fascia, communicates with the saphenous nerve, and is distributed to the skin of the tibial side of the leg as low down as its middle.

See also
 Cutaneous innervation of the lower limbs#Thigh

References

External links
  - "Superficial Anatomy of the Lower Extremity: Cutaneous Nerves of the Anterior Thigh and Leg"

Nerves of the lower limb and lower torso